Pila Kole Ninigi is a Papua New Guinea politician. He is a Member of the National Parliament of Papua New Guinea, and represented the seat of Imbonggu Open from 1997 to 1998 and was re-elected to the seat in 2017.

Early life 
Niningi graduated from the University of Papua New Guinea with a Bachelor of Laws.

Political career 
He was first elected to the National Parliament in the 1997 general election. He was declared the winner of the seat on 14 August 1998 following a recount which was ordered by the Court of Disputed Returns. He was appointed as Minister for Public Services in October 1998 under Bill Skate, but was disqualified from Parliament by a Supreme Court decision on 28 October 1998.

He was later re-elected to the National Parliament in the 2017 general election as an Independent. He was appointed as Minister for Higher Education, Research, Science and Technology in the O'Neill-Abel Cabinet. He was then appointed as Minister for Inter-Government Relations on 7 June 2019 as part of the First Marape Cabinet.

References 

Members of the National Parliament of Papua New Guinea
Living people
University of Papua New Guinea alumni
People's National Congress (Papua New Guinea) politicians
Government ministers of Papua New Guinea
Year of birth missing (living people)